This is a list of Billboard magazine's Top Hot 100 songs of 2004.

References

See also
2004 in music
List of Billboard Hot 100 number-one singles of 2004
List of Billboard Hot 100 top-ten singles in 2004

Billboard charts
United States Hot 100 Year-end